Live! Volume One is the first live album released by the O.C. Supertones. It was recorded during four different shows on the Loud and Clear tour in 2001: Casper, Wyoming, Spokane, Washington, Seattle, Washington and Portland, Oregon. Adam Ferry was the drummer at the time but was not pictured due to his departure. Ferry played on this record and the song "Heavens Got a Baby" for the BEC Christmas compilation.

Track listing
"Unite"
"Unknown"
"Resolution"
"What It Comes To"
"Grounded"
"Sure Shot"
"Jury Duty"
"Adonai"
"Away from You"
"You Are My King (Amazing Love)"
"Holiness"
"Open the Eyes of My Heart"
"Little Man"
"Return of the Revolution"
"So Great a Salvation"
"Who Can Be Against Me"
"Supertones Strike Back"

Credits 

Players
 Matt Morginsky – lead vocals
 Daniel Spencer – trombone, backing vocals, hype man
 Ethan Luck – guitar, backing vocals, hype man
 Darren Mettler – trumpet, backing vocals, hype man
 Tony Terusa – bass, backing vocals, hype man
 Adam Ferry – drums

Album Production
 Bill Stevenson – engineer
 Jason Livermore – engineer
 Stephen Egerton – mixing

References 

The O.C. Supertones albums
2002 live albums